Chloroclystis annimasi is a moth in the family Geometridae. It is endemic to Saudi Arabia.

References

External links

Moths described in 1982
annimasi
Moths of the Middle East
Endemic fauna of Saudi Arabia